Fjermeros is a Norwegian surname. Notable people with the surname include:

Bue Fjermeros (1912–2000), Norwegian lawyer and politician
Karl Johan Fjermeros (1885–1972), Norwegian politician

Norwegian-language surnames